James Castle may refer to:

 James Castle (politician) (1836–1903), U.S. Representative from Minnesota
 James Bicknell Castle  (1855–1918), businessman in Hawaii
 James Charles Castle (1899–1977), American artist-bookmaker from Idaho
 James Castle (sculptor) (born 1946), Scottish sculptor
 J. R. Castle (born 1959), former American lacrosse player
 Jimmy Castle, a character in the film Dirty Dancing
 James Castle, title designer for Castle Bryant Johnsen